de Lucy or de Luci  (alternate spellings: Lucey, Lucie, Luce, Luci) is the surname of an old Norman noble family originating from Lucé in Normandy, one of the great baronial Anglo-Norman families which became rooted in England after the Norman conquest. The first records are about Adrian de Luci (born about 1064 in Lucé, Normandy, France) who went into England after William the Conqueror. The rise of this family might have been due to Henry I of England, although there are no historical proofs that all de Lucys belonged to the same family. The family name is Gallo-Roman, mentioned in 616 as Luciacus, Lucy, Luci, Lucé derive from the Latin cognomen Lucius, meaning "born with the daylight" or Gaulish Lucus, Lucius, Lucco from Loco- / Luco- possibly "wolf" + suffix -(i)acum "place, property" of Gaulish origin.

Most notable people from de Lucy (Luci) family

Richard de Luci
Richard de Luci (c. 1089–14 July 1179) was Sheriff of the County of Essex, Chief Justiciar of England and excommunicated by Thomas Becket in 1166 and 1169. He married Rohese, who might have been a sister of Faramus of Boulogne.

Walter de Luci
Walter de Luci (also Walter de Lucy) was brother of Richard de Luci. He was a monk at Lonlay Abbey in Normandy, then was elected Abbot of Battle Abbey in Sussex, England. He died while still abbot on June 21, 1171.

Godfrey de Luci
Godfrey de Luci (also Godfrey de Lucy) (c. 1124– 11 September 1204) was son of Richard de Luci. He was nominated Archdeacon of Derby, and Bishop of Winchester.

Reginald de Luci
Reginald de Luci also known as Reynold was an itinerant judge in the Counties of Nottingham and Derby in 1173. He was governor of Nottingham. He had a son, Richard, who succeeded him.

Robert de Luci
Robert de Luci was sheriff of the County of Worcester in 1175. He was the brother of Richard de Luci, the Chief Justiciar of England.

Stephen de Luci
Stephen de Luci (13th century), one of the sons of Walter de Charlecotte, the first with his brother William de Luci to use the surname Luci. His brother, William de Luci, was the ancestor of Thomas de Luci (also known as Thomas Lucy de Charlecotte). Stephen de Luci was nominated one of justice itinerant by Henry III of England in 1228.

Anthony de Lucy, 1st Baron Lucy of Cockermouth
Anthony de Lucy (1283– 10 June 1343) fought at the Battle of Bannockburn, 1314, under Lord Clifford; became Warden of the West March in 1318; arrested and put on trial Andrew Harclay, 1st Earl of Carlisle, 1323, and was made Lord of Cockermouth in that year; made Chief Justiciar of Ireland in 1331; was keeper of Berwick and justiciar of English-held Scotland, 1334-37. The "predominant magnate in the far North-West, superseding the Cliffords..."

Anthony de Lucy, 3rd Baron Lucy
Anthony de Lucy, 3rd Baron Lucy was the second son of Thomas de Lucy, 2nd Baron Lucy (died 1365) and grandson of the Anthony de Lucy mentioned above. He was born around 1332/33, and was probably killed in 1368, at New Kaunas, Lithuania, while on crusade fighting for the Teutonic Knights. It is widely accepted that the well-preserved body of a knight found at St Bees Priory is that of Anthony de Lucy, known, prior to his identification, as St Bees Man.

Thomas Lucy de Charlecotte
Sir Thomas Lucy (24 April 1532 – 7 July 1600) was a magistrate and an evangelical living in Charlecote near Stratford-on-Avon, Warwickshire. He persecuted recusant Catholic families in the area, including William Shakespeare's maternal relatives. He assumed the surname Lucy, probably descended from the Norman de Luci family by his mother's line.

See also
 Baron Lucy
 Richard de Luci
 Walter de Luci
 Godfrey de Luci
 Thomas (de) Lucy
 Norman conquest of England
 Normandy
 Charlecote Park

Notes and references

Bibliography
 Charles Wareing Endell Bardsley, A Dictionary of English and Welsh Surnames: With Special American Instances, London: H. Frowde, 1901
 George Edward Cokayne, The Complete Peerage of England, Scotland, Ireland, Great Britain, and the United Kingdom Extant, Extinct, or Dormant; first edition by George Edward Cokayne, Clarenceux King of Arms; 2nd edition revised by the Hon. Vicary Gibbs et al., 1959;  .
 Edward Foss, Biographia Juridica: A Biographical Dictionary of the Judges of England from the Conquest to the Present Time, 1066-1870, The Lawbook Exchange, Ltd., 1999
 Edward Foss, The Judges of England: with sketches of their lives, and miscellaneous notices connected with the Courts at Westminster, from the ime of the Conquest, Longman, Brown, Green, and Longmans, 1848
 Lewis Christopher Loyd, Charles Travis Clay, David Charles Douglas, The Origins of Some Anglo-Norman Families, Genealogical Publishing Com, 1975
 Mark Antony Lower, Patronymica Britannica: A Dictionary of the Family Names of the United Kingdom, J.R. Smith, 1860
 Lucey & Lucy Family History by Norman Lucey - full genealogy for deLuci at http://www.rickmansworthherts.com/webpage10.htm

Lucy, de
Lucy, de
English people of French descent